John Batten may refer to:

 John Batten (rugby union) (1853–1917), English  rugby union fullback
 John Batten (physician) (1924–2013), British physician
 John Batten (1903—1993), New Zealander actor
 John D. Batten (1860–1932), English painter, book illustrator and printmaker
 John Mount Batten (1843–1916), British soldier and landowner